Black & White & Sex is a 2011 feature film produced by Melissa Beauford. It is the directorial debut of John Winter, best known as the producer of Rabbit Proof Fence, Paperback Hero and Doing Time for Patsy Cline. The film premiered at the Sydney Film Festival in June 2011 with its international premiere at the 41st International Film Festival Rotterdam (2012).

Development 
Black & White & Sex follows a film-within-a-film structure. The entire 94 minutes is a two hander interview between a documentary filmmaker (played by Matthew Holmes) and a sex worker, Angie. Eight different facets of Angie's personality are exposed by eight actresses: Katherine Hicks, Anya Beyersdorf, Valerie Bader, Roxane Wilson, Michelle Vergara Moore, Dina Panozzo, Saskia Burmeister and Maia Thomas.

As the name suggests, Black & White & Sex is shot entirely in black and white.

Synopsis
A filmmaker is shooting a documentary about sex. He interviews a sex worker, Angie. As she reveals herself, layer-by-layer, she also exposes the man who is interviewing her.

Production 
Black & White & Sex was shot using a four-camera set up. Each scene was rehearsed before the shoot, but not on the day of the shoot. This meant the actors were "free to roam and be very much in the moment".

Release 
Black & White & Sex premiered at the Sydney Film Festival on Saturday 18 June 2011. It was listed by several bloggers and publications as one of the top 5 films that must be seen at the Festival. It was picked up by distributor Titan View, who released the film in Australia/New Zealand in 2012, and by international sales agent, Shoreline Entertainment.

The film had its international premiere at the 41st International Film Festival Rotterdam. followed by a number of other festivals including selection in the New Talent Competition at the Taipei Film Festival

The film won the 'Best Experimental' award at the 2012 ATOM Awards.

References

External links

 
 

2011 films
2011 drama films
Australian drama films
Films about filmmaking
Films about prostitution in Australia
Australian black-and-white films
2011 directorial debut films
2010s English-language films